is a 1984 film based on the television jidaigeki Hissatsu Shigotonin series. The film is an occasionally whimsical Japanese drama about assassins.

Plot
Source:

Nakamura Mondo is an officer of the Minamimachi Bugyosho, but is also the head of the assassin group. Unidentified corpses are discovered one after another in the town of Edo. Mondo is ordered by his boss Tanaka to investigate a serial murder.

Cast
 Makoto Fujita as Nakamura Mondo
 Kunihiko Mitamura as Hide
 Izumi Ayukawa as Kayo
 Kiyoshi Nakajō as Yuji
 Isuzu Yamada as Oriku
 Kin Sugai as Nakamura Sen
 Mari Shiraki as Nakamura Ritsu
 Toshio Yamauchi as Tanaka
 Gannosuke Ashiya as Masa
 Keiko Hayshi as Otami
 Shōhei Hino as Senta
 Kie Nakai as Oyō
 Yukiji Asaoka as Okō
 Naoko Ken as Oyone
 Fujio Akatsuka as Kasumi no Hankichi
 Takao Kataoka as Asanosuke

Reception
 Japan Academy Film Prize for Outstanding Performance by an Actress in a Supporting Role : Kin Sugai

References

External links

1984 films
1980s adventure films
1980s Japanese-language films
Jidaigeki films
Samurai films
Films set in the Edo period
1980s Japanese films